Alfred Jenkins III (born April 1, 1964) is a former American football quarterback who played one season with the Dallas Texans of the Arena Football League (AFL). He was drafted by the Washington Redskins with the 248th pick in the 1987 NFL Draft. He played college football at the University of Arizona. Jenkins was also a member of the Ottawa Rough Riders of the Canadian Football League (CFL).

Jenkins attended Lynwood High School in Lynwood, California.

References

External links
Just Sports Stats
College stats

Living people
1964 births
African-American players of American football
African-American players of Canadian football
American football quarterbacks
Arizona Wildcats football players
Canadian football quarterbacks
Dallas Texans (Arena) players
Ottawa Rough Riders players
People from Lynwood, California
Players of American football from California
Sportspeople from Los Angeles County, California
21st-century African-American people
20th-century African-American sportspeople